Allophorocera ferruginea is a species of fly in the family Tachinidae. It is a Palearctic species found over most of Europe.

References

Diptera of Europe
Insects described in 1824
Tachinidae
Palearctic insects